Danny Lane (born 27 January 1955) is an American artist, best known for his glass and steel sculpture. Lane is also known for his work in art furniture and contemporary design. He lives and works in London.

Lane came to attention in the 1980s through his art furniture. He moved into large-scale public sculpture in the 1990s, being responsible in 2006 for Borealis, believed to be the largest glass sculpture in the world. Lane's work can be found in public spaces and collections worldwide, such as London Underground, Canary Wharf Plc, Victoria & Albert Museum, Microsoft, British Land Plc, Rolex UK, British Airports Authority, Swire Properties (Hong Kong) and General Motors (USA).

To construct his glass sculptures, Lane exploits the strength of glass under compression and its qualities of luminosity. This approach expands on traditional methods of glass and metal smithing and has resulted in a varied body of work, from monumental structures made from industrial float glass and steel, to coloured glass sculpture, casts and design objects.

Life and career

Education and early work
Lane was born in 1955 in Urbana, Illinois, in the United States. During his childhood, his family moved many times, from Virginia to West Germany, New York City’s Greenwich Village and finally Baltimore. Travelling through Europe exposed Lane to a wide range of art and architecture.

Lane moved to the United Kingdom in 1975 to begin an apprenticeship with stained-glass artist Patrick Reyntiens at Burleighfield House in Buckinghamshire, and then Ruskin School, Oxford, before attending a foundation course in Fine Art at the Byam Shaw School of Art in London.

Reyntiens recommended Lane to the Central School of Art & Design, London, where he trained as a painter under artist Cecil Collins, whose personal philosophy and method of teaching influenced Lane's own creative development. As well as teaching Lane how to be analytical about materials, Collins introduced him to concepts of mysticism and the spirituality of art.

1980s and Design Objects

Though now well known for his large-scale public artworks, Lane was first known in the 1980s for the construction of his design objects and art furniture. These objects often have functional names, but frequently venture into abstraction.

In 1981, Lane established his first studio in London's East End, Hackney, where time spent in local workshops gave him a respect for traditional craftsmanship, and saw him begin to accumulate stacks of metal, glass and wood with which to experiment. Lane then began developing objects using industrial float glass, and by the mid-1980s he was experimenting with assemblage, uniting found materials in his furniture.

During this period in the early 1980s, Lane met designer Ron Arad. Within a year of their meeting, he was offered his first solo exhibition at Arad's influential shop One Off in Shelton Street, London, where he showed several works including Romeo and Juliet table (1984). In 1984 Lane exhibited abroad for the first time at the International Furniture Fair in Milan, making folding glass screens with sandblasted and acid etched drawings.

In 1986, Lane began to exhibit work at London's Themes & Variations gallery. During these early years, he developed a series of editioned works and by the end of the 1980s, Lane had exhibited work at solo shows in London, Paris and Milan.

Best known from this period, Lane's Etruscan Chair (1985) is featured in several museum collections. The piece was constructed from inch-thick float glass, industrial nuts and bolts, forged stainless steel and aluminium.

Another work from this period is Angaraib (1987), which takes its name from the traditional Sudanese rope-bed, united with the concept of the North American Indian 'horse travois'. The work is constructed from the branches of a storm damaged London plane tree, bound together with hemp rope, on top of which sits a raft of glass.

By 1989, Lane's focus on larger-scale works required him to move to his current studio and gallery where he is still based today, a 10,000 square foot converted factory in Willesden, West London. The studio employs a team of technicians and is equipped with glass furnaces, kilns, offices and an exhibition space.

Public Sculpture

In the early 1990s, Lane's focus shifted to making large-scale glass and steel sculptures for public and corporate spaces.
Lane's first public commissions occurred in the late 1980s, including Stacked Glass Fountain (1986) in Miami, Florida and etched glass screens and a wall sculpture for the British Embassy in Helsinki in 1989, both of which contained elements that provided the basis for later work.

From 1989 to 1990, Lane travelled to Tokyo and Osaka in Japan to produce new commissions. Further work followed during 1991-93 across China, Spain and London and Edinburgh in the United Kingdom, including Wave Wall (1993) for Dalian Glass Company, China, which saw Lane experimenting with curving glass walls that refract light.

In 1994, Lane was commissioned by the Victoria & Albert Museum, London to create a glass balustrade for their new Glass Gallery. The balustrade is made up of 140 pillars of cut glass, lining the stairs leading to a glass mezzanine floor

In 1996, the steel and glass sculpture Man Catching A Star was commissioned for the Wembley Stadium approach in London. More public sculptures followed over subsequent years, including glass water sculptures in China and India, Pantheon for Henley Festival in 2000 and The Presence of Seven (2002) in Meadville, Pennsylvania.

In 2003, Lane made Parting of the Waves for Canary Wharf Plc, East London. The work is a 4m high, 10m long ribbon of glass running each side of the north entrance. It was constructed from 2000 narrow strips of glass, which are locked into place by their own weight.

The following year in 2004, Opening Line, a 90-m long public sculpture, was created for the Gateshead public transport interchange, Nexus at Gateshead, Tyne and Wear. The work contains multiple references to the local culture and history of Gateshead, such as engineering and maritime culture. Also in 2004, Ellipsis Eclipses was made for Newcastle’s city centre, situated outside The Gate entertainment centre.

2005 saw further public sculptures produced including Assembly Field at the National Assembly for Wales in Cardiff and Stairway, for Cass Sculpture Foundation in the UK. Stairway is a glass and steel construction that rises up into the sky with no landing platform, designed to be reminiscent of Jacob's Ladder.

In May 2006, Lane produced Borealis for the General Motors Renaissance Center in Detroit, USA, which is believed to be the largest glass sculpture in existence. The work was inspired by the Aurora Borealis, a spectacle that Lane references in the refraction of light through the numerous strips of glass.

Colour Eclipse was made in 2009 for Bishopsgate's Broadgate Tower in London, one of many coloured glass works created in this period using furnace technology. Other coloured glass works such as Blue Moon demonstrated this method on a smaller scale.

In 2010, Lane produced Threshold, commissioned by the Mint Museum in Charlotte, North Carolina. Coloured glass objects arranged behind the curving glass wall were backlit to produce numerous shifting reflections, while the title Threshold directly references Lane's interest in the metaphysical experience of art.

In recent years, Aether (2013) was produced for the window of Marble Arch House, London, commissioned by British Land Plc.

Steel Work

When first working with metal, Lane did not have his own forge or know how to weld, yet his interest in this process resulted in several pieces early in his career. Lane cites the origin of his interest in steel as his admiration for the work of Antoni Gaudi, and especially the work of Josep Maria Jujol at Gaudí's Casa Milà in Barcelona.

Early in his career, Lane produced RSJ Table (1985). Moscow Bar, designed the following year in 1986 with Simon Holbrook, was an interior installation, comprising bar, tables and chairs for the Moscow Club on Soho's Frith Street, London.

The late 1980s saw Lane shift into large-scale metal work. Lane developed methods of heating steel, making it possible to bend metal freely into what he calls "steel drawings," which are produced to function much like industrial-scale automatic drawings. An example of this work is Saddle (2006), in which a twisted metallic ribbon supports a glass tabletop.

Carved and fuse casts

Lane has experimented with new methods in recent years, producing new non-commissioned sculptural works. Progressing from early explorations with glass casting, Lane has coined a new process as ‘carved casts’, in which he spontaneously cuts into the mold material. This creates thick reliefs when melted into the carved molds.

These ‘carved casts’ were influenced by Lane's admiration for ancient traditions of stone carving and classical sculpture relief.

Style and process
Lane has developed a "post-tensioning" method that exploits the strength of glass under compression, a process he refers to as 'shish-kebabing'. This is achieved by threading a steel rod through layered glass. His Stacking Chair (1986) was the first demonstration of this technique, now in the collection of the Victoria & Albert Museum, London.

Lane frequently incorporates smooth pieces of glass with broken edges (polished to safety). He has also created glass screens, in which he draws images on glass through acid-etching. As well as these monumental works in industrial float glass, timbers and forged steel have played a growing role in his repertoire.

Lane sees his art as fundamentally metaphysical and experimental. He works intuitively, conscious of maintaining elements of accident and chance in his work.

Lane's early training in drawing and fine art has remained a cornerstone of his technique throughout his career. He has produced thousands of drawings, which provide the initial concepts for many of his sculptures.

Personal life
Danny Lane lives in Maida Vale, West London. His father, M. Daniel Lane, was a scientist and his mother was an art historian and environmentalist. He has two children, Lauren and Joseph.

References

External links
 Bloomberg - Brilliant Ideas: Danny Lane (Film)
 Inception Gallery - Danny Lane profile and gallery of works

American glass artists
20th-century American sculptors
Alumni of the Byam Shaw School of Art
Alumni of the Central School of Art and Design
Living people
1955 births
21st-century American sculptors
American emigrants to the United Kingdom